Bryan Fisher (born August 1, 1980) is a British-American actor who is best known for his role as Jason McNamara, Carmen's boyfriend in George Lopez. He has also guest starred in many other shows such as The Invisible Man, The Chronicle, and also starred in the 2006 TV movie Jekyll + Hyde.

Filmography

References

External links

British male child actors
American male film actors
American male television actors
Living people
1982 births